Artifacts in Motion is the first studio album from Finnish progressive metalcore band Circle of Contempt. It was released by Sumerian Records on 23 November 2009.

Track listing

Personnel
Circle of Contempt
Riku Haavisto – vocals 
Risto-Matti Toivonen – guitar
Joni Kosonen – guitar
Markus Karhumäki – bass guitar 
JP Kaukonen – drums

Production
 Jori Haukio – production, engineering

References

2009 debut albums
Circle of Contempt albums